Isabelle Leymarie is a French musicologist, writer, pianist, filmmaker, translator and photographer.

Early life

As a young child, Isabelle Leymarie developed a passion for African-American music (and also Broadway tunes and the French, Spanish and Russian composers of the late 19th and early 20th century). At the age of 4 she began to study classical music privately, and then at the Conservatoire de Musique de Genève (Switzerland). She obtained a degree in sociology from the Sorbonne and studied ethnomusicology at the École pratique des hautes études in Paris. After studies for a doctorate at the Institute of International Studies in Geneva, she graduated from Columbia University with a PhD in ethnomusicology.

Career

In 1968, Isabelle Leymarie worked in the African Department of the Musée national des Arts d'Afrique et d'Océanie, the Music Department of the Musée de l'Homme and at Ocora (a record label specialized in ethnic music and belonging to Radio France). In 1969, at the Panafrican Arts Festival, in Algiers, she escorted a Yoruba delegation of artists and scholars. She also taught at the American College in Leysin (Switzerland).

Beginning in 1970, she studied in New York at the Jazzmobile, Jazz Interactions and Muse workshops; with Barry Harris; with Charlie Palmieri at The City College of New York; and privately. She wrote film treatments for Sam Shaw (producer of John Cassavetes and photographer of Marilyn Monroe) and wrote several screenplays, among them "Malva", which was to be made by Gordon Parks Jr. before his untimely death. She was New York correspondent for the National French Radio jazz program "Black and Blue". She taught at the College For Human Services, John Jay College, Herbert Lehman College, The New School for Social Research, Cooper Union, Boricua College, the Conservatory of São Miguel (Azores, Portugal), the Jazz Department of Livingston College and Yale. She was music curator of El Museo del Barrio, in New York, consultant for the New York State Council on the Arts (NYSCA), escort-interpreter for the State Department, and consultant for various films and television programs. In 1973 she lived in Senegal, doing field work on the griots and their music.

As a pianist she performed in particular with the Cotton Club Orchestra (Harlem), Melba Liston (New York), Cab Calloway's bass player Jimmy Garret (Japan), Clifford Thornton (Switzerland), as well as with her own groups. She also worked with Latin bands, and sat in with the Machito orchestra at Livingston College

In the early 1990s, in Paris, she was musical director for jazz of the Théâtre du Châtelet and the :fr:Auditorium des Halles (inviting Shirley Horn, Abbey Lincoln, John Stubblefield, Wynton Marsalis, Ahmad Jamal, Tommy Flanagan, Mulgrew Miller, Dom Salvador, James Newton, Angélique Kidjo, etc.). She was also in charge of the jazz festival of Le Marin (Martinique). She taught in the Jazz Department of the Conservatoire Nadia et Lili Boulanger, at the École Supérieure de Jazz and the Bill Evans Piano Academy. She was "godmother" of the salsa festival of Vic-Fezensac (France), vice-president of the Centre de Musique populaire de Céret, consultant for the Latin Jazz exhibition organized by the Smithsonian Institution in Washington, D.C., and director of the music collection for the French publisher Buchet Chastel. She organized concerts for the Musée national des Arts d'Afrique et d'Océanie and the Centre Pompidou, produced radio programs for France Musique, France Culture and Radio Canada and hosted programs on Salsa TV. In Paris, she also studied for ten years with the French jazz pianist Bernard Maury. She has given lectures and workshops in several countries; taught Latin dancing in France and Belgium. She translated over forty books into French, among them the biographies of Ella Fitzgerald, Marvin Gaye, Otis Redding, Chet Baker and Johann Sebastian Bach.

Publications

Articles in

Elle, Jeune Afrique, Magazine de l'ORTF, Ethnomusicology, Routes, Jazz Spotlite News, Nuestro, Canales, La Tribune de Genève, Arts et Vie, Jazz and Keyboard Workshop, Vogue, Africa, Latin American Music Review, Cahiers de Musiques Traditionnelles, Courrier de l'Unesco, Les Lettres Françaises, Le Monde d'Hermès, Percussions, L'autre Afrique, Le Monde de la musique, Jazz Magazine, Les Cahiers du Jazz, Le Courrier, New West Indian Guide, One More Time, and other publications.
Isabelle Leymarie has written liner notes for several record labels.

Texts in collective books

 

 

 

 

 

 

 

 

 

 

 

 

  (in French)

Bibliography

  (published in French and Turkish)

  (in French)

 
 
 

  (published in Spanish and French)

  (in French)

  (in French)

  (published in English, French and Spanish)

  (awarded the :fr:Prix des Muses Prix des Muses)

Translations

Filmography

 "Machito: A Latin Jazz Legacy” (1987), 58 minutes, written and produced by Isabelle Leymarie, co-directed with Carlos Ortiz 
1989 Festival Latino, New York
First Prize Winner, 1988 San Juan Film Festival
1987 American Film & Video Festival
Jury Prize Winner, 1986 San Antonio Film Festival
 "Latin Jazz à New York" (1991), 52 minutes
 "Paris Jazz" (2004), 52 minutes

References

Living people
Year of birth missing (living people)